Russell Robertson (born 1928) was a Canadian ice hockey player with the East York Lyndhursts. He won a silver medal at the 1954 World Ice Hockey Championships in Stockholm, Sweden.

References

1928 births
Living people
Canadian ice hockey defencemen
East York Lyndhursts players